Gaurav Chatterji is an Indian music composer. He is primarily recognized for composing music for films like Jai Mummy Di, Ginny Weds Sunny, Aafat-e-Ishq and Jalsa.

Career 
In 2020, Chatterji made his debut with composing music for the film Jai Mummy Di.  
Same year, he composed for the film Ginny Weds Sunny and Happily Ever After.
In 2021, Chatterji composed for the film Aafat-e-Ishq. Hiren Kotwani of Times Of India in review of film, said: “Gaurav Chatterji’s music is pleasing to the ears, especially the peppy Love Ka Bhoot reloaded”.
In 2022, he composed for the film Jalsa. Anna M.M. Vetticad of Firstpost in review of film, said: “Gaurav Chatterji’s grim background score make every moment in Jalsa count”. Bollywood Hungama in its review of film, said: “Gaurav Chatterji's background score is very subtle and very impactful”. Zoom in its review of the film said: “Apart from the gasps of those watching the film with you, it's the brilliant background score, by Gaurav Chatterji, that adds even more drama to the already captivating tale”.
He was nominated for Mirchi Music Awards for the film Ginny Weds Sunny.

Discography

Single

References

External links
 
Indian composers
Indian film score composers
Year of birth missing (living people)
Living people